O Blood and Water (Polish: O krwi i wodo), also known as conversion prayer, is a prayer to the Divine Mercy revealed by Jesus to Faustina Kowalska.

Its full text, as reported in the Diary, is: "O blood and water, which gushed forth from the heart of Jesus as a fountain of mercy for us, I/we trust in You". In the Polish original it is: O krwi i wodo, któraś wytrysnęła z serca Jezusowego jako zdrój miłosierdzia dla nas, ufam/-y tobie.

It may be regarded as an extension of the ejaculatory prayer Jezu, ufam tobie ("Jesus, I trust in You"), set under the Divine Mercy image (according to Diary 47).

It is given three times in the Diary (84, 187, 309), for the first time under the date of August 2, 1934. Jesus himself promised to Faustina Kowalska: When you say this prayer, with a contrite heart and with faith on behalf of some sinner, I will give him the grace of conversion (186).

This prayer is often said in the hour of mercy (3 p.m.), when someone has no time for a longer prayer like the Chaplet of Divine Mercy because of the duties (as recommended in Diary 1320, 1572). It is also applied in various other situations, especially when someone meets a sinner (as Jesus requires passim in the Diary).

It invokes the Divine Mercy that is given to the humanity from the cross of Jesus. Blood and water from his side pierced by a spear (John 19:34) symbolizes the grace of sacraments: help and forgiveness (cf. Diary 299). This is also the meaning of the red and white ray in the Divine Mercy image.

External links
Saint Faustina
Divine Mercy in Action
University of Glasgow

Christian prayer
Catholic devotions
Divine Mercy
Blood of Christ